Jean Pierre Cantin (born 7 December 1966) is a Canadian judoka. He competed in the men's half-lightweight event at the 1992 Summer Olympics.

References

1966 births
Living people
Canadian male judoka
Olympic judoka of Canada
Judoka at the 1992 Summer Olympics
Sportspeople from Quebec
Commonwealth Games medallists in judo
Commonwealth Games bronze medallists for Canada
Judoka at the 1990 Commonwealth Games
Pan American Games medalists in judo
Pan American Games silver medalists for Canada
Pan American Games bronze medalists for Canada
Judoka at the 1991 Pan American Games
Judoka at the 1995 Pan American Games
20th-century Canadian people
21st-century Canadian people
Medallists at the 1990 Commonwealth Games